Angel's Dream is a 15-episode Singaporean Mandarin drama television series aired on MediaCorp TV Channel 8 in 2000. The drama series revolves around a murder case and stars Ivy Lee, Terence Cao, Huang Biren and Apple Hong. It was the Best Drama Serial of the year and won Ivy Lee the Best Actress award at the Star Awards 2000. It is produced by MediaCorp's acclaimed producer, Kok Len Shoong.

Plot
Anqi was imprisoned for manslaughter. The victim was her husband Zi Wen. There were doubts as to whether she indeed killed him. The usual suspects - her long-time good friend Ye Ning who had a child with Zi Wen, Shi Sheng who was Anqi's partner in an illicit affair and the father of Anqi's daughter, a cop who wanted to kill Anqi.

The actual solution is completely unexpected.

Cast
 Ivy Lee as Chen Anqi
 Terence Cao
 Huang Biren
 Apple Hong
 Robin Leong
 Michelle Chong
 Richard Low

Awards

External links
Official website

Singapore Chinese dramas
2000s Singaporean television series
2000 Singaporean television series debuts
Channel 8 (Singapore) original programming